This is a list of the current and defunct discount chains of the United Kingdom. This list does not include discount supermarket chains which can be found at list of supermarket chains in the United Kingdom.

List of current discount shops

List of defunct discount shops

References

Discount stores
 
 
Retail
Discount stores in the United Kingdom
Convenience Stores
Convenience Stores